Andris Kolbergs (21 December 1938 – 5 November 2021) was a Latvian writer.

Biography
Born on 21 December 1938, Andris was the son of ship captain Leonid Kolbergs. He studied at Moscow State University of Printing Arts from 1966 to 1968. He worked as a wagonmaker and electrical factory worker before becoming a correspondent for the humorous magazine Dadzis.

Kolbergs published his first novel in 1969, titled Arnolda Zandes cigarete.

Andris Kolbergs died of COVID-19 in Riga on 5 November 2021 at the age of 82.

Decorations
Officer of the Order of the Three Stars (2019)

Works
Arnolda Zandes cigarete (1969)
Šāviens dienas laikā (1971)
Pašu puikas (1974)
Vanags (1974)
Krimināllieta trijām dienām (1977)
Cilvēks, kas skrēja pāri ielai (1978)
Fotogrāfija ar sievieti un mežakuili (1983)
Atraitne janvārī (1984)
Ēna (1985)
Naktī, lietū (1986)
Automobilī, rīta pusē (1986)
Nekas nav noticis (1988)
Kolekcionāra mīlas dēkas (1988)
Civilizēto krokodilu sindroms (1993)
Dumpis uz laupītāju kuģa (1993)
Meklējiet sievieti (1996)
Pulkstenis ar atpakaļgaitu (2002)
Klaunu maršs šausmu tirgū (2002)
Sieviete melnā (2004)
Patiesi stāsti par VIP un kolekcionēšanas dullumu (2005)
Sarkans automobilis melnā naktī (2008)

References

1938 births
2021 deaths
Writers from Riga
20th-century Latvian writers
21st-century Latvian writers
Latvian male writers
20th-century male writers
21st-century male writers
Recipients of the Order of the Three Stars